Jefferson County is a county in the Commonwealth of Pennsylvania. As of the 2020 census, the population was 44,492. Its county seat is Brookville. The county was established on March 26, 1804, from part of Lycoming County and later organized in 1830. It is named for President Thomas Jefferson. It is home to Punxsutawney Phil, the most famous groundhog that predicts when spring will come every February 2 on Groundhog Day.

Geography
It has a warm-summer humid continental climate (Dfb) and average monthly temperatures in Brookville range from 24.8 °F in January to 68.8 °F in July, while in Punxsutawney they range from 25.7 °F in January to 69.6 °F in July.

Adjacent counties
 Forest County (northwest)
 Elk County (northeast)
 Clearfield County (east)
 Indiana County (south)
 Armstrong County (southwest)
 Clarion County (west)

Major highways

Streams
There are many named streams flowing through Jefferson County, far too many to list here. An exhaustive list is presented in a separate article. All those streams eventually flow to the Allegheny River except for Bear Run, in the southeast which flows into the Susquehanna River. The principal streams and the area of their watersheds that lie within the county are:
 Clarion River: 
 Little Toby Creek: 
 Clear Creek: 
 Cathers Run: 
 Mill Creek: 
 Redbank Creek: 
 North Fork Creek: 
 Clear Run: 
 Pekin Run: 
 Sandy Lick Creek: 
 Wolf Run: 
 Soldier Run: 
 Trout Run: 
 Mill Creek: 
 Fivemile Run: 
 Falls Creek: 
 Little Sandy Creek: 
 Mahoning Creek: 
 East Branch Mahoning Creek: 
 Stump Creek: 
 Big Run: 
 Canoe Creek: 
 Elk Run: 
 Pine Run:

Demographics

As of the census of 2000, there were 45,932 people, 18,375 households, and 12,862 families residing in the county.  The population density was 70 people per square mile (27/km2).  There were 22,104 housing units at an average density of 34 per square mile (13/km2).  The racial makeup of the county was 98.97% White, 0.13% Black or African American, 0.16% Native American, 0.21% Asian, 0.01% Pacific Islander, 0.07% from other races, and 0.45% from two or more races.  0.41% of the population were Hispanic or Latino of any race. 31.1% were of German, 13.4% Italian, 10.8% American, 9.2% Irish and 7.8% English ancestry.

There were 18,375 households, out of which 30.30% had children under the age of 18 living with them, 56.80% were married couples living together, 9.10% had a female householder with no husband present, and 30.00% were non-families. 26.60% of all households were made up of individuals, and 13.80% had someone living alone who was 65 years of age or older.  The average household size was 2.45 and the average family size was 2.96.

In the county, the population was spread out, with 23.60% under the age of 18, 7.70% from 18 to 24, 27.20% from 25 to 44, 23.60% from 45 to 64, and 17.90% who were 65 years of age or older.  The median age was 40 years. For every 100 females there were 95.70 males.  For every 100 females age 18 and over, there were 92.60 males.

2020 Census

Law and government

Jefferson County is a very safe county for the Republican Party, which has won the vote of all but two presidential elections.

|}

Voter Registration
As of February 21, 2022, there are 27,832 registered voters in Jefferson County.

 Democratic: 6,500 (23.35%)
 Republican: 18,289 (65.71%)
 Independent: 1,926 (6.92%)
 Third Party: 1,117 (4.01%)

County Commissioners
 Herbert L. Bullers Jr.(R)
 Scott E. North(R)
 Jeffrey E. Pisarcik(D)

State Senate
 Cris Dush, Republican, Pennsylvania's 25th Senatorial District

State House of Representatives
 Brian Smith, Republican, Pennsylvania's 66th Representative District

United States House of Representatives
 G.T. Thompson, Republican, Pennsylvania's 15th congressional district

United States Senate
 John Fetterman, Democrat
 Bob Casey Jr., Democrat

Education

Colleges and universities
 Indiana University of Pennsylvania
 Clarion University of Pennsylvania
 Butler County Community College (Brockway)

Public school districts
 Brockway Area School District
 Brookville Area School District
 Clarion-Limestone Area School District
 DuBois Area School District
 Punxsutawney Area School District

Related public entities
 Jefferson County-DuBois AVTS
 Riverview Intermediate Unit #6

Private schools
 Allens Mills School - Reynoldsville
 Bear Lane School - Punxsutawney
 Blose Hill Amish School - Reynoldsville
 Bucks Run - Reynoldsville
 Canoe Ridge Amish School - Rossiter
 Christ Dominion Academy
 Colonial Drake - Punxsutawney
 Eagles Nest Amish School - Brockway
 Highland Park - Punxsutawney
 Hillside School - Punxsutawney
 Lone Maple School - Punxsutawney
 Maple Grove School - Reynoldsville
 Mountain View School - Punxsutawney
 Munderf Amish School - Brockway
 Oak Grove Parochial School - Smicksburg
 Pine Valley Parochial School - Punxsutawney
 Playhouse Children's Center - Punxsutawney
 Praise Christian Academy - Reynoldsville
 Punxsutawney Christian Sch - Ele Level - Punxsutawney
 Spring Hollow Amish School - Reynoldsville
 Spring Run School - Smickburg
 Sts Cosmas & Damian School - Punxsutawney
 Trout Run School - Punxsutawney
 Valley View School - Punxsutawney
 West Creek Road Amish School - Punxsutawney
 Willow Drive School - Punxsutawney
 Windy Hollow Amish School - Mayport

Libraries
 Jefferson County Library System - Brockway
 Mengle Memorial Library - Brockway
 Punxsutawney Memorial Library - Punxsutawney
 Rebecca M Arthurs Memorial Library - Brookville
 Reynoldsville Public Library - Reynoldsville
 Summerville Public Library - Summerville
 Sykesville Public Library - Sykesville

Licensed entities
 Full Circle Inc Boys Home - Reynolds
 Jefferson County Adult Detention Center
 Western Pennsylvania School of Taxidermy - Oliveburg

Recreation
Two Pennsylvania state parks are in the county.
 Clear Creek State Park is in Barnett and Heath Townships.
 Cook Forest State Park is in Barnett Township and stretches into neighboring Clarion and Forest Counties

The Jefferson County Fair is held annually in July.

Communities

Under Pennsylvania law, there are four types of incorporated municipalities: cities, boroughs, townships, and, in at most two cases, towns. The following boroughs and townships are located in Jefferson County:

Boroughs

 Big Run
 Brockway
 Brookville (county seat)
 Corsica
 Falls Creek (partly in Clearfield County)
 Punxsutawney
 Reynoldsville
 Summerville
 Sykesville
 Timblin
 Worthville

Townships

 Barnett
 Beaver
 Bell
 Clover
 Eldred
 Gaskill
 Heath
 Henderson
 Knox
 McCalmont
 Oliver
 Perry
 Pine Creek
 Polk
 Porter
 Ringgold
 Rose
 Snyder
 Union
 Warsaw
 Washington
 Winslow
 Young

Census-designated place
 Crenshaw

Unincorporated communities

 Adrian Mines
 Alaska
 Allens Mills
 Anita
 Baxter
 Beechtree
 Beechwoods
 Bells Mills
 Blowtown
 Bowersville
 Cloe
 Coal Glen
 Conifer
 Content
 Coolspring
 Cortez
 Desire
 Dora
 East Branch
 Ella
 Emerickville
 Fordham
 Forestville
 Frostburg
 Fuller
 Hamilton
 Hazen
 Heathville
 Horatio
 Howe
 Kahletown
 Knox Dale
 Lanes Mills
 Langville
 Markton
 McMinns Summit
 Munderf
 North Freedom
 Ohl
 Oliveburg
 Panic
 Pancoast
 Pansy
 Pardus
 Port Barnett
 Porter
 Prescottville
 Ramsaytown
 Rathmel
 Richardsville
 Ringgold
 Rockdale
 Roseville
 Sandy Valley
 Schoffner Corner
 Sigel
 Soldier
 Sprankle Mills
 Stanton
 Stump Creek
 Sugar Hill
 Valier
 Walston
 Warsaw
 Westville
 Winslow
 Wishaw

Population ranking
The population ranking of the following table is based on the 2010 census of Jefferson County.

† county seat

Notable people
 John T. Morrison, sixth Governor of Idaho from 1903 until 1905; born in Jefferson County.
 Sparky Lyle, professional baseball player
 Chuck Daly, American basketball head coach
 George Jenks, politician
 Florence Parry Heide, author
 Wilbur Good, professional baseball player
 Andy Hastings, professional football player
 Mal Eason, professional baseball player
 John Mizerock, professional baseball player
 Devin Mesoraco, professional baseball player
 Jim Pittsley, professional baseball player
 Britt Baker, professional wrestler and dentist
Laura Temple, missionary teacher and archaeologist in Mexico

See also
 National Register of Historic Places listings in Jefferson County, Pennsylvania
 Oil Creek Library District

References

 
Pennsylvania counties
1830 establishments in Pennsylvania
Counties of Appalachia
Populated places established in 1830